Prince Siriraj Kakudhabhand (27 November 1885 – 31 May 1887) was the Prince of Siam (later Thailand). He was a member of the Siamese royal family and was the son of King Chulalongkorn and Queen Saovabha Phongsri.

Siriraj Hospital is named after him.  He was the 53rd child of King Chulalongkorn and the fifth child of Queen Saovabha Phongsri.

Ancestry

References 

1885 births
1887 deaths
19th-century Thai royalty who died as children
19th-century Chakri dynasty
Thai male Chao Fa
Children of Chulalongkorn
Sons of kings